The 2019–20 season was Bristol City's 122nd season as a professional football club and their fifth consecutive season in the Championship. Along with competing in the Championship, the club also participated in the FA Cup and the EFL Cup. The season covered the period from 1 July 2019 to 22 July 2020.

Statistics

|-
!colspan=15|Players out on loan:

|-
!colspan=14|Players who left during the season:

|}

Goals record

Disciplinary record

Transfers

Transfers in

Loans in

Loans out

Transfers out

Pre-season
The Robins confirmed pre-season friendlies against Hallen AFC Wimbledon, Forest Green Rovers, Crystal Palace and Weston-super-Mare.

Competitions

Championship

League table

Results by matchday

Result summary

Matches
On Thursday, 20 June 2019, the EFL Championship fixtures were revealed. The football season was suspended due to COVID-19 pandemic, and restarted on 20 June 2020.

FA Cup

The third round draw was made live on BBC Two from Etihad Stadium, Micah Richards and Tony Adams conducted the draw.

EFL Cup

The first round draw was made on 20 June.

References

Bristol City
Bristol City F.C. seasons